Coriscus of Scepsis and his brother Erastus were students of Plato.  He was also a friend of Aristotle.  Coriscus' son Neleus is mentioned as inheriting Aristotle's library.

Scepsis is located about fifty kilometers from Assos in Asia Minor, to which Aristotle and Xenocrates traveled after Plato's death.

References

 

4th-century BC Greek people
4th-century BC philosophers
Students of Plato
Academic philosophers